Don Bosco Technical High School (called as Don Bosco Trade School from 1946 to 1954 and officially named Don Bosco School of Technology from 1993 until its closure) was an all-boys Roman Catholic secondary school for grades 9 through 12 in Boston, Massachusetts, United States. It was founded in 1946 as a school for immigrant boys by the Salesians of Don Bosco, a religious order of priests and brothers, and closed in 1998.

History

Founding and expansion 

In 1945, the Salesians of Don Bosco in Boston purchased the neglected former John Paul Jones School building, built in 1898, located at 145 Byron St. in East Boston and renovated it. Don Bosco Trade School, as it was known then, opened for the 1946-1947 school year with two teachers, Br. Julius Bollati, S.D.B. and Br. Angelo Bongiorno, S.D.B. and 16 students. The new school was founded in almost a perfect location and time period: it served large numbers of the underprivileged children of mostly Roman Catholic Italian immigrants, offering both a trade and religious education. By 1954, enrollment had grown to 200, making the Byron St. campus too crowded.

The school, in partnership with the Salesian province leadership, proceeded to search for a property in Boston fulfilling the necessary requirements. The school leadership looked in a few locations, including Jamaica Plain and the South End. Initially (January 1954) a site on Rockwood St in Jamaica Plain was chosen; however, in August 1954 this plan was abandoned in favor of the former Brandeis High School on Tremont Street, South End. Don Bosco Technical High School remained at this site until its closure in 1998.

New campus and growth 
The Salesians moved into the Brandeis Vocational School Campus, the main building of which was formerly the City of Boston Continuation School, with the two sides of the building split into Boys' and Girls' Units, in time for the 1954 school year. During this time there was a Salesian seminary program at Don Bosco Tech, which was terminated in later years. The original brick/limestone building was built in the 1920s. This was plenty of space to house the student body of 200 plus Salesian quarters. In the years following the student population rose rapidly, reaching 562 in 1966.

Decline and closure 
By 1974 the school reached its peak enrollment at around 900 students. After that, it struggled as its facilities aged and enrollment declined. In 1971 and 1985 two new buildings were added to the campus to hold expanded electronics departments which were very popular during those years.

On March 15, 1989, 10,800 spectators packed the old Boston Garden to watch the MIAA Division I State Hockey Championship game against the highly successful & perennial powerhouse Catholic Memorial. They came back from 2-0 and won the game 5-2, to the delight and surprise of the fans. The championship rings given to coaches and members were gold and silver with an emerald green stone. A bear, which was Don Bosco Tech's mascot, and the player's name were engraved on the sides.

By 1991, enrollment had dipped to 625. A few years later, in an attempt to rebrand and attract new students, the school was renamed Don Bosco School of Technology. In 1998, for mostly financial real estate reasons the school was forced to close.

The building was renovated and turned into a DoubleTree by Hilton hotel, while the gymnasium and pool now serves as the Wang YMCA.

Demographics

Leadership 

Note: The years listed for many of the school officials listed above may not be complete; only those years which have verifiably been recorded as years at the school have been listed. For example, Fr. Jay Verona, S.D.B. may have served for many years before and after 1966 but sources were only able to confirm the year of 1966.

Athletics

Championships

Basketball 
 1975  Catholic Conference Co- Champions
 1975 National Champions
 1976 Division 1 State Champions
 1982 Division 1 North Champions (no state champions this year due Prop 2 1/2)
 1983 Division 1 North Champions (no state champions this year due Prop 2 1/2)

Football 
 1974 Catholic Conference Champions

Hockey 
 1981 Division I State Champions
 1989 Division I State Champions

Notable alumni
Steve DeOssie, former National Football League player
Joe Amorosino, sports broadcaster 
John Cunniff, hockey player
Paul Feeney, Massachusetts State Senator
Frank Baker, member of Boston City Council
Billy O'Dwyer, hockey player with NHL LA Kings, Boston Bruins

Popular culture
 Fallout 4, set in the area around Boston, Massachusetts, has as one of the locations 'D. B. Technical High School'

External links
 Facebook page

References 

1946 establishments in Massachusetts
1940s in Boston
1998 disestablishments in Massachusetts
1998 in Boston
Boys' schools in Massachusetts
Defunct boys' schools in the United States
Defunct Catholic secondary schools in Massachusetts
Educational institutions established in 1946
Educational institutions disestablished in 1998
High schools in Boston
Roman Catholic Archdiocese of Boston
Salesian secondary schools
School buildings completed in 1898